Valeria Gagealov (9 December 1931 – 9 February 2021) was a Romanian film, radio, theater, television and voice actress.

Biography 
She then worked for many years at the National Theatre Bucharest, where she played Curley's wife in Of Mice and Men by John Steinbeck, and Sonia in Camera de alături by Paul Everac.

In the early 1950s, she was married to fellow actor Constantin Codrescu, but some strange circumstances involving his mother (who tried to poison Gagealov) led to divorce. Later on she married Andrei Magheru, a diplomat,  and then followed him to Paris when he became Romania's ambassador to France in 1990.

She died from COVID-19 at Elias Hospital in Bucharest on 9 February 2021, at the age of 89, during the COVID-19 pandemic in Romania.

Filmography 
Her filmography was the following:
 La Moara cu noroc (1955)
 Momente Caragiale - Tren de plăcere (1958)
 Mutter Courage (1962) - Yvette Pottier
 Columna (1968)
 Castelul condamnaților (1970) 
 Mihai Viteazul (1971) 
 Serata (1971)
 Puterea și adevărul (1972)
 Un august în flăcări (1973)
 Departe de Tipperary (1973)
 Când trăiești mai adevărat (1974)
 Singurătatea florilor (1976) - Ema
 Mihail, câine de circ (1979) - Mary Emory
 Bietul Ioanide (1980) - Doamna Lascaris
 Întoarcerea lui Vodă Lăpușneanu (1980)
 Ultima noapte de dragoste (1980)
 Promisiuni (1985)
 Inimă de țigan (2007)

References 

1931 births
2021 deaths
People from Galați
Recipients of the Order of Cultural Merit (Romania)
21st-century Romanian actresses
20th-century Romanian actresses
Romanian voice actresses
Romanian television actresses
Romanian stage actresses
Romanian radio actresses
Romanian film actresses
Deaths from the COVID-19 pandemic in Romania
Caragiale National University of Theatre and Film alumni
Romanian expatriates in France